General elections were held in the Dominican Republic on 16 May 1990. Following a long vote count, Joaquín Balaguer of the Social Christian Reformist Party (PSRC) was declared winner of the presidential election, whilst in the Congressional elections the PSRC received the most votes and won a majority in the Senate, although the Dominican Liberation Party won the most seats in the House of Representatives.

Balaguer's victory prompted protests and accusations of fraud. This led the Central Elections Authority to introduce several reforms to the electoral law in 1992, including an increase in the number of members of the Authority and the production of a new electoral roll.

Results

President

Congress

References

Dominican
General
Elections in the Dominican Republic
Presidential elections in the Dominican Republic
Election and referendum articles with incomplete results
Dominican